Aurelio Chu Yi (31 January 1929 – 4 July 1998) was a Panamanian judoka. He competed in the men's lightweight event at the 1964 Summer Olympics.

References

1929 births
1998 deaths
Panamanian male judoka
Olympic judoka of Panama
Judoka at the 1964 Summer Olympics